Valentine "Vale" P. Thielman (October 10, 1843 – February 21, 1925) was an American politician. He served in the South Dakota State Senate from 1889 to 1890. He also sat in the Dakota Territory Legislature from 1881 to 1882.

References

1843 births
1925 deaths
German emigrants to the United States
People from Turner County, South Dakota
Members of the Dakota Territorial Legislature
19th-century American politicians
Republican Party South Dakota state senators